Baalzebub is a genus of ray spiders first described by Jonathan A. Coddington in 1986. Spiders in this genus typically live in dark environments, like caves.

Species 
 it contains seven extant and one fossil species:
 B. acutum Prete, Cizauskas & Brescovit, 2016 — Brazil
 B. albonotatus (Petrunkevitch, 1930) — Puerto Rico
 B. baubo Coddington, 1986 — Costa Rica, Panama, Brazil
 B. brauni (Wunderlich, 1976) — Australia (Queensland)
 B. nemesis Miller, Griswold & Yin, 2009 — China
 B. rastrarius Zhao & Li, 2012 — China
 B. youyiensis Zhao & Li, 2012 — China
 ?†B. mesozoicum  - Vendée amber, France, Turonian later considered to be stem-Theridiosomatidae

References

External links 

Araneomorphae genera
Theridiosomatidae
Spiders of Asia
Spiders of Central America
Spiders of South America
Spiders of the Caribbean
Spiders of Australia